Tocumwal railway line may refer to:

Tocumwal railway line, New South Wales, the New South Wales Government Railways route closed in 1988
Tocumwal railway line, Victoria, the Victorian Railways route from Seymour railway station